Holly Liu is an American businesswoman and venture capitalist. She is the co-founder of the mobile gaming company Kabam. She is currently Non-Executive Director and Strategic Adviser to Animoca's board of directors.

Education 
She studied at the University of California, Berkeley and at the University of California, Los Angeles.

Career 
Liu is the co-founded mobile gaming company Kabam in 2006; maker of the games: Kingdoms of Camelot, The Hobbit: Kingdoms of Middle-earth, and Marvel Contest of Champions. She was lead designer of their flagship game Kingdoms of Camelot, which grossed over $250 million in just four years. Liu was instrumental in growing the company’s annual revenue from zero to $400m. She was also the founding mobile designer for the game extension Battle for the North, which made Kingdoms of Camelot the highest-grossing app for iPhone and iPad in 2012.

In January 2017, the majority of Kabam’s assets were acquired by Netmarble, South Korea’s largest mobile gaming company. Following her exit from Kabam, Liu took on a role as a visiting partner at Y Combinator, an accelerator providing seeded funding to nearly 2,000 startups with a combined value of over $80 billion.

In June 2018 she was appointed Non-Executive Director and Strategic Adviser to Animoca's board of directors.

She is on the advisory board at University of California, Berkeley School of Information.

Recognition 
She has been named one of Fortune’s “10 Most Powerful Women in Gaming”, Forbes’ “12 Women in Gaming to Watch.” and Forbes - "10 Women Entrepreneurs to Watch from Google Ventures' Portfolio Companies".

She was also named by Inc as a Top 10 female founder unicorn.

In 2018, she received the Grace Hopper Celebration of Women in Computing Technology Entrepreneurship Award and she was featured among "America's Top 50 Women In Tech" by Forbes.

References 

Living people
21st-century American businesspeople
American technology chief executives
American technology company founders
American venture capitalists
American video game designers
American video game programmers
American video game producers
American women chief executives
American women company founders
American company founders
University of California, Berkeley alumni
University of California, Los Angeles alumni
Y Combinator people
Year of birth missing (living people)
Women video game designers
21st-century American businesswomen